Klęcinko  is a village  in the administrative  of Klęcino, within Słupsk County, Pomeranian Voivodeship, in northern Poland.

For the history of the region, see History of Pomerania.

The village  has a population of 120.

References

Villages in Słupsk County